The Šuica  which is known as the Šujica (Шујица), is a sinking river flowing through Duvanjsko Polje and the wider region of Tropolje in Bosnia and Herzegovina. The river also runs through its subterranean section, which begins at the point where river goes underground within the main estavelle (ponor) at Kovači. This section of the Šuica is traversable for trained speleologists with proper equipment.

Its sources are Mali Stržanj and Veliki Stržanj, both close to village of Stržanj. It flows through and drains most of its waters from Kupreško Polje, the Šuica Valley and Duvanjsko Polje. The river disappears underground in large Kovači estavelle, eponymous of nearby village Kovači, in southwestern corner of Duvanjsko Polje. Waters of the Šuica than partially re-emerges at the source of Ričina in village Prisoje, which than empties into the reservoir of Buško Blato after a short flow of cca 0–50 meters, depending on the water levels in reservoir.

References 

Rivers of Bosnia and Herzegovina
Sinking rivers of Bosnia and Herzegovina
Subterranean rivers of Bosnia and Herzegovina
Buško Blato basin
Underground lakes of Bosnia and Herzegovina